Déjà-Vu is the third and currently last studio album by Brazilian band Metrô, released in 2002 by independent label Trama. Their first album of new material in 15 years after they first broke up, it reunited them with former vocalist Virginie Boutaud, who had been fired from the band in 1986. Original guitarist Alec Haiat decided not to partake in the band's reunion though due to his involvement with other projects at the time and other personal reasons, and so was replaced by André Fonseca. Xavier Leblanc, who was also very busy with his then-newly founded French bistro, La Tartine, only acted as a session member on the tracks "Achei Bonito" and "Johnny Love", being subsequently replaced by Pedro Albuquerque until the band separated again in 2004.

Contrasting with the new wave sound the band had developed during its heyday in the mid-1980s, Déjà-Vu heads toward a much slower direction influenced by jazz and traditional Brazilian genres such as samba, bossa nova and MPB, and contains numerous covers of popular singers of such genres like Caetano Veloso, Jorge Ben Jor, Ary Barroso, Jair Rodrigues and Ataulfo Alves. Re-recordings of some of their hits from the 1980s ("Sândalo de Dândi", "Johnny Love" and "Beat Acelerado") are also included.

The album counts with many guest musicians, such as Waly Salomão (in one of his last credited works prior to his death one year after the album's release), Preta Gil, Otto, Lucas Santtana, Jorge Mautner and Nélson Jacobina. Remixes of four of the album's tracks by different DJs are included as bonus tracks.

Music videos were made for the tracks "Resemblances", "Mensagem de Amor" and "Achei Bonito"; both were directed by producer Dany Roland's wife, filmmaker Bia Lessa.

Critical reception
Writing for Omelete, Alexandre Nagado gave the album 3 out of 5 stars, calling it "pleasant" – however, he also stated that "rockers might not enjoy the [album's] repertoire due to its MPB-influenced sonority".

Track listing

Personnel
 Virginie Boutaud – vocals
 Daniel "Dany" Roland – ambience, drums, production 
 Yann Laouenan – keyboards, production
 André Fonseca – acoustic and electric guitar
 Bruno LT – DJ loops 
 Pedro Albuquerque – acoustic bass 
 Preta Gil – additional vocals (tracks 3 and 5)
 Lucas Santtana – acoustic guitar
 Jorge Mautner – violin, additional vocals (track 13)
 Otto – vocals (track 15)
 Waly Salomão – vocals (track 15)
 Nélson Jacobina – acoustic guitar
 Xavier Leblanc – bass guitar (tracks 2 and 6)
 Thiago Queiroz – baritone and alto saxophone
 Pedro Paulo Júnior – trumpet 
 Alexandre Fonseca – tabla
 Apollo 9 – remixing

References

External links
 Déjà-Vu on Metrô's semi-official website

2002 albums
Metrô (band) albums
Portuguese-language albums